The Division of Bourke was an Australian electoral division in Victoria. The division was proclaimed in 1900, and was one of the original 65 divisions to be contested at the first federal election. It was abolished in 1949. It was named for Sir Richard Bourke, who was Governor of New South Wales at the time of the founding of Melbourne. It was based in the northern suburbs of Melbourne, including the suburbs of Brunswick and Coburg. After 1910, it was a safe seat for the Australian Labor Party, but was lost to an independent Labor member in 1946.

Members

Election results

1901 establishments in Australia
Constituencies established in 1901
Bourke